Gurdeep Samra (born 5 May 1983) (also known as G Samra) is a British Asian bhangra music producer and DJ from Bicester, England. Gurdeep was born in Oxford and is of Jatt descent.

In 2002, Gurdeep released a collaboration with Panjabi folk music singer, Surinder Shinda. The song, "Jatt Panjab" became a minor radio favorite with specialist Asian music stations in the UK. The track caught the attention of Markie Mark who licensed the song for the compilation album Desi Beats Vol 1. This album was released by the UK imprint of the music label Def Jam. Since this debut, Gurdeep has continued to release music independently. His track "Mittare Naie", which featured Lehmber Hussainpuri from The First Cut EP is another notable hit.

Gurdeep also hosted a weekly radio show on Sanjhi Awaz Radio between 2010 and 2012.

Discography
2003 - Panjabi Hit Squad’s Desi Beats Vol 1 - Def Jam UK (Various Artists Compilation - Contributor)
2005 - The First Cut EP - Gurdeep Samra
2005 - Ashlene Nand presents BHOOD - Bollyhood Records (Various Artists Comp - Contributor)
2005 - Jade Foxx's LAWHT Mixtape 2 - Full Impact (Compilation/Contributor)
2005 - Future World Funk’s On The Run - Ether Music (Various Artists Comp - Contributor)
2006 - Beginners Guide to Asian Lounge - Nascente Music (Various Artists Comp - Contributor)
2007 - Back for the Second EP - Gurdeep Samra
2007 - Project 3 EP - Gurdeep Samra
2009 - The First Cut EP (Remastered Edition) - Gurdeep Samra
2009 - Just the Beats: Vol 1 - Gurdeep Samra (Instrumental compilation)
2009 - Ready & Reloaded EP - Gurdeep Samra
2009 - Undercover Funk EP - Gurdeep Samra
2017 - "Bhangra" (feat. Amreek Meeka) [Digital Single] - Gurdeep Samra
2017 - "Starz" (feat. Anil Aftab & Dgio) [Digital Single] - Gurdeep Samra
2018 - The Throwback - Gurdeep Samra (Compilation)
2018 - "Pretty Look Gal" (feat. Cheshire Cat) [Digital Single] - Gurdeep Samra
2019 - "Get Something Started" (feat. Dgio & Emily Perkins) - Gurdeep Samra

External links
Official website

1983 births
Living people
English composers
English hip hop musicians
English DJs
English Sikhs
Asian Underground musicians
Alumni of Oxford Brookes University